Fragilis refers to something fragile.

Some uses are:

Medicine
The IFITM1 gene expressed by cells in the primitive streak during germ line development.

Zoology

Latin words and phrases